Football Club Kolhapur City is an Indian professional football club based in Kolhapur, Maharashtra, that competes in both the Indian Women's League and WIFA Women's Football League, the top tier national and regional leagues respectively, of women's football in India.
They registered their first win 
in IWL 2019–20 against Baroda FA under head coach Muzamil Mahmood.

History 
The club was launched in October 2018, with the aim of playing in U13, U15, and U18 national leagues.

In 2019–20 season, after winning qualifiers for Maharashtra zone, the club participated in Indian Women's League.

Crest 
In the crest of FC Kolhapur City, a gaur is present, which represents strength and courage.

Stadium 
FC Kolhapur City plays their home matches in Rajarshi Shahu Stadium in Kolhapur, Maharashtra.

Journey in IWL 
Kolhapur City got their first win after defeating Baroda FA and finished 4th in group A with 4 points.

Honours 
WIFA Women's Football League
Champions (1): 2018–19
Runners-up (1): 2019–20

References 

Football clubs in Maharashtra
Women's football clubs in India
2018 establishments in Maharashtra
Association football clubs established in 2018
Indian Women's League clubs